Johanna König (27 March 1921 – 3 March 2009) was a German actress. She appeared in more than 50 films and television shows between 1952 and 1999. König was born in Leipzig, Germany and died in Berlin on 3 March 2009.

Selected filmography
 Nights on the Road (1952)
 Munchhausen in Africa (1958)
 Mikosch, the Pride of the Company (1958)
 Kein Mann zum Heiraten (1959)
 Mandolins and Moonlight (1959)
 Mikosch of the Secret Service (1959)
 Conny and Peter Make Music (1960)
 Robert and Bertram (1961)
 Come to the Blue Adriatic (1966)
 Hotel Clausewitz (1967)
 Zum Teufel mit der Penne (1968)
 Jane is Jane Forever (1977)

References

External links
 

1921 births
2009 deaths
German film actresses
Actors from Leipzig